Eutropis bibronii, also known commonly as Bibron's mabuya, Bibron's skink, and the seashore skink, is a species of lizard in the family Scincidae. The species is native to India and Sri Lanka.

Etymology
The specific name, bibronii, is in honor of French herpetologist Gabriel Bibron (1806–1848).

Description
The head of E. bibronii is somewhat flattened. The lower eyelid has a transparent disk. The scales on the dorsum and flanks are sharp, numbering 5–7. The scale rows at midbody number 28–30. There are 14–20 lamellae under the fourth toe. The dorsum is olive brown, with a light vertebral stripe which is dark-edged. A dark dorso-lateral stripe runs from the eye to the base of the tail.

Ecology
E. bibronii occurs is a fossorial species that has been observed burrowing in low vegetation on sand dunes.

Reproduction
The mode of reproduction of E. bibronii is unknown.

References

Further reading
Boulenger GA (1890). The Fauna of British India, Including Ceylon and Burma. Reptilia and Batrachia. London: Secretary of State for India in Council. (Taylor and Francis, printers). xviii + 541 pp. (Mabuia bibronii, p. 184).
Das I (1991). "A new species of Mabuya from Tamil Nadu State, Southern India (Squamata: Scincidae)". Journal of Herpetology 25 (3): 342–344.
Gray JE (1838). "Catalogue of the Slender-tongued Saurians, with Descriptions of many new Genera and Species [Part 2]". Annals and Magazine of Natural History, First Series 2: 287–293. (Tiliqua bibronii, new species, p. 25).
Mausfeld P, Schmitz A, Böhme W, Misof B, Vrcibradic D, Rocha CFD (2002). "Phylogenetic Affinities of Mabuya atlantica Schmidt, 1945, Endemic to the Atlantic Ocean Archipelago of Fernando Noronha (Brazil): Necessity of Partitioning the Genus Mabuya Fitzinger, 1826 (Scincidae: Lygosominae)". Zoologischer Anzeiger 241: 281–293.
Smith MA (1935). The Fauna of British India, Including Ceylon and Burma. Reptilia and Amphibia. Vol. II.—Sauria. London: Secretary of State for India in Council. (Taylor and Francis, printers). xiii + 440 pp. + Plate I + 2 maps. (Mabuya bibroni, p. 260).

Eutropis
Lizards of Asia
Reptiles of India
Reptiles of Sri Lanka
Reptiles described in 1838
Taxa named by John Edward Gray